Milwaukee marked a return of Elliott Murphy collaborating with Talking Heads member Jerry Harrison, a former bandmate, who served as producer after performing on Murphy's 1976 album Night Lights. Milwaukee was his first album released on the French label New Rose in Europe.

Track listing
All tracks composed by Elliott Murphy.

"Taking The Silence"
"People Don't Learn"
"Out For The Killing"
"Sister Real"
"Niagara Falls"
"Running Around"
"Clean It Up"
"Texas"
"He Who Laughs Last (Laughs Alone)" 
"Going Through Something (Don't Know What It Is)"

Personnel
Elliott Murphy - vocals, guitar, harmonica, keyboards
Art Lbriola - piano, keyboards
Jesse Chamberlain - drums
Ernie Brooks - bass
Jerry Harrison - synthesizer
Technical
David Vartanian - engineer

References

1985 albums
Elliott Murphy albums
Albums produced by Jerry Harrison